A steady-state economy is an economy made up of a constant stock of physical wealth (capital) and a constant population size. In effect, such an economy does not grow in the course of time.  The term usually refers to the national economy of a particular country, but it is also applicable to the economic system of a city, a region, or the entire world. Early in the history of economic thought, classical economist Adam Smith of the 18th century developed the concept of a stationary state of an economy: Smith believed that any national economy in the world would sooner or later settle in a final state of stationarity.

Since the 1970s, the concept of a steady-state economy has been associated mainly with the work of leading ecological economist Herman Daly.   As Daly's concept of a steady-state includes the ecological analysis of natural resource flows through the economy, his concept differs from the original classical concept of a stationary state. One other difference is that Daly recommends immediate political action to establish the steady-state economy by imposing permanent government restrictions on all resource use, whereas economists of the classical period believed that the final stationary state of any economy would evolve by itself without any government intervention.

The world's mounting ecological problems have brought about a widening interest in the concept of a steady-state economy. Critics of the steady-state economy usually object to it by arguing that resource decoupling, technological development, and the operation of market mechanisms are capable of overcoming resource scarcity, pollution, or population overshoot. Proponents of the steady-state economy, on the other hand, maintain that these objections remain insubstantial and mistaken — and that the need for a steady-state economy is becoming more compelling every day.
 
A steady-state economy is not to be confused with economic stagnation: Whereas a steady-state economy is established as the result of deliberate political action, economic stagnation is the unexpected and unwelcome failure of a growth economy. An ideological contrast to the steady-state economy is formed by the concept of a post-scarcity economy.

Definition and vision 
Since the 1970s, the concept of a steady-state economy has been associated mainly with the work of leading ecological economist Herman Daly — to such an extent that even his boldest critics recognize the prominence of his work.  

Herman Daly defines his concept of a steady-state economy as an economic system made up of a constant stock of physical wealth (capital) and a constant stock of people (population), both stocks to be maintained by a flow of natural resources through the system. The first component, the constant stocks, is similar to the concept of the stationary state, originally used in classical economics; the second component, the flow of natural resources, is a new ecological feature, presently also used in the academic discipline of ecological economics. The durability of both of the constant stocks is to be maximized: The more durable the stock of capital is, the smaller the flow of natural resources is needed to maintain the stock; likewise, a 'durable' population means a population enjoying a high life expectancy — something desirable by itself — maintained by a low birth rate and an equally low death rate. Taken together, higher durability translates into better ecology in the system as a whole.

Daly's concept of a steady-state economy is based on the vision that man's economy is an open subsystem embedded in a finite natural environment of scarce resources and fragile ecosystems. The economy is maintained by importing valuable natural resources from the input end and exporting valueless waste and pollution at the output end in a constant and irreversible flow. Any subsystem of a finite nongrowing system must itself at some point also become nongrowing and start maintaining itself in a steady-state as far as possible. This vision is opposed to mainstream neoclassical economics, where the economy is represented by an isolated and circular model with goods and services exchanging endlessly between companies and households, without exhibiting any physical contact to the natural environment.

In the early 2010s, reviewers sympathetic towards Daly's concept of a steady-state economy have passed the concurrent judgement that although his concept remains beyond what is politically feasible at present, there is room for mainstream thinking and collective action to approach the concept in the future.   In 2022 a research (chapters 4–5) described degrowth toward a steady state economy as something possible and probably positive. The study ends by the words:"The case for a transition to a steady-state economy with low throughput and low emissions, initially in the high-income economies and then in rapidly growing economies, needs more serious attention and international cooperation.

Historical background 
For centuries, economists and other scholars have considered matters of natural resource scarcity and limits to growth, from the early classical economists in the 18th and 19th centuries down to the ecological concerns that emerged in the second half of the 20th century and developed into the formation of ecological economics as an independent academic subdiscipline in economics.

Concept of the stationary state in classical economics 

From Adam Smith and onwards, economists in the classical period of economic theorising described the general development of society in terms of a contrast between the scarcity of arable agricultural land on the one hand, and the growth of population and capital on the other hand. The incomes from gross production were distributed as rents, profits and wages among landowners, capitalists and labourers respectively, and these three classes were incessantly engaged in the struggle for increasing their own share. The accumulation of capital (net investments) would sooner or later come to an end as the rate of profit fell to a minimum or to nil. At that point, the economy would settle in a final stationary state with a constant population size and a constant stock of capital.

Adam Smith's concept 

Adam Smith's magnum opus on The Wealth of Nations, published in 1776, laid the foundation of classical economics in Britain. Smith thereby disseminated and established a concept that has since been a cornerstone in economics throughout most of the world: In a liberal capitalist society, provided with a stable institutional and legal framework, an 'invisible hand' will ensure that the enlightened self-interest of all members of society will contribute to the growth and prosperity of society as a whole, thereby leading to an 'obvious and simple system of natural liberty'.

Smith was convinced of the beneficial effect of the enlightened self-interest on the wealth of nations; but he was less certain this wealth would grow forever. Smith observed that any country in the world found itself in either a 'progressive', a 'stationary', or a 'declining' state: Although England was wealthier than its North American colonies, wages were higher in the latter place as wealth in North America was growing faster than in England; hence, North America was in the 'cheerful and hearty' progressive state. In China, on the other hand, wages were low, the condition of poor people was scantier than in any nation in Europe, and more marriages were contracted here because the 'horrid' killing of newborn babies was permitted and even widely practised; hence, China was in the 'dull' stationary state, although it did not yet seem to be declining. In nations situated in the 'melancholic' declining state, the higher ranks of society would fall down and settle for occupation amid the lower ranks, while the lowest ranks would either subsist on a miserable and insufficient wage, resort to begging or crime, or slide into starvation and early death. Bengal and some other English settlements in the East Indies possibly found themselves in this state, Smith reckoned.

Smith pointed out that as wealth was growing in any nation, the rate of profit would tend to fall and investment opportunities would diminish. In a nation that had thereby reached this 'full complement of riches', society would finally settle in a stationary state with a constant stock of people and capital. In an 18th-century anticipation of The Limits to Growth (see below), Smith described the state as follows:

According to Smith, Holland seemed to be approaching this stationary state, although at a much higher level than in China. Smith believed the laws and institutions of China prevented this country from achieving the potential wealth its soil, climate and situation might have admitted of. Smith was unable to provide any contemporary examples of a nation in the world that had in fact reached the full complement of riches and thus had settled in stationarity, because, as he conjectured, "... perhaps no country has ever yet arrived at this degree of opulence."

David Ricardo's concept 

In the early 19th century, David Ricardo was the leading economist of the day and the champion of British laissez-faire liberalism. He is known today for his free trade principle of comparative advantage, and for his formulation of the controversial labor theory of value. Ricardo replaced Adam Smith's empirical reasoning with abstract principles and deductive argument. This new methodology would later become the norm in economics as a science.

In Ricardo's times, Britain's trade with the European continent was somewhat disrupted during the Napoleonic Wars that had raged since 1803. The Continental System brought into effect a large-scale embargo against British trade, whereby the nation's food supply came to rely heavily on domestic agriculture to the benefit of the landowning classes. When the wars ended with Napoleon's final defeat in 1815, the landowning classes dominating the British parliament had managed to tighten the existing Corn Laws in order to retain their monopoly status on the home market during peacetime. The controversial Corn Laws were a protectionist two-sided measure of subsidies on corn exports and tariffs on corn imports. The tightening was opposed by both the capitalist and the labouring classes, as the high price of bread effectively reduced real profits and real wages in the economy. So was the political setting when Ricardo published his treatise On the Principles of Political Economy and Taxation in 1817.

According to Ricardo, the limits to growth were ever present due to scarcity of arable agricultural land in the country. In the wake of the wartime period, the British economy seemed to be approaching the stationary state as population was growing, plots of land with lower fertility were put into agricultural use, and the rising rents of the rural landowning class were crowding out the profits of the urban capitalists. This was the broad outline of Ricardo's controversial land rent theory. Ricardo believed that the only way for Britain to avoid the stationary state was to increase her volume of international trade: The country should export more industrial products and start importing cheap agricultural products from abroad in turn. However, this course of development was impeded by the Corn Laws that seemed to be hampering both the industrialisation and the internationalization of the British economy. In the 1820s, Ricardo and his followers – Ricardo himself died in 1823 – directed much of their fire at the Corn Laws in order to have them repealed, and various other free trade campaigners borrowed indiscriminately from Ricardo's doctrines to suit their agenda.

The Corn Laws were not repealed before 1846. In the meantime, the British economy kept growing, a fact that effectively undermined the credibility and thrust of Ricardian economics in Britain; but Ricardo had by now established himself as the first stationary state theorist in the history of economic thought.

Ricardo's preoccupation with class conflict anticipated the work of Karl Marx (see below).

John Stuart Mill's concept 

John Stuart Mill was the leading economist, philosopher and social reformer in mid-19th century Britain. His economics treatise on the Principles of Political Economy, published in 1848, attained status as the standard textbook in economics throughout the English-speaking world until the turn of the century.

A champion of classical liberalism, Mill believed that an ideal society should allow all individuals to pursue their own good without any interference from others or from government. Also a utilitarian philosopher, Mill regarded the 'Greatest Happiness Principle' as the ultimate ideal for a harmonious society:

Mill's concept of the stationary state was strongly coloured by these ideals.  Mill conjectured that the stationary state of society was not too far away in the future:

Contrary to both Smith and Ricardo before him, Mill took an optimistic view on the future stationary state. Mill could not "... regard the stationary state of capital and wealth with the unaffected aversion so generally manifested toward it by political economists of the old school." Instead, Mill attributed many important qualities to this future state, he even believed the state would bring about "... a very considerable improvement on our present condition." According to Mill, the stationary state was at one and the same time inevitable, necessary and desirable: It was inevitable, because the accumulation of capital would bring about a falling rate of profit that would diminish investment opportunities and hamper further accumulation; it was also necessary, because mankind had to learn how to reduce its size and its level of consumption within the boundaries set by nature and by employment opportunities; finally, the stationary state was desirable, as it would ease the introduction of public income redistibution schemes, create more equality and put an end to man's ruthless struggle to get by — instead, the human spirit would be liberated to the benefit of more elevated social and cultural activities, 'the graces of life'.

Hence, Mill was able to express all of his liberal ideals for mankind through his concept of the stationary state.  It has been argued that Mill essentially made a quality-of-life argument for the stationary state.

Main developments in economics since Mill 

When the influence of John Stuart Mill and his Principles declined, the classical-liberalist period of economic theorising came to an end. By the turn of the 19th century, Marxism and neoclassical economics had emerged to dominate economics. This development led to the exclusion of any concern with natural resource scarcity in economic modelling and analysis:

 Although a classical economist in his own right, Karl Marx abandoned the earlier concept of a stationary state and replaced it with his own unique vision of historical materialism, according to which human societies pass through several 'modes of production', eventually leading to communism. In each mode of production, man's increasing mastery over nature and the 'productive forces' of society develop to a point where the class conflict bursts into revolutions, followed by the establishment of a new mode of production. In opposition to his liberalist predecessors in the field, Marx did not regard natural resource scarcity as a factor constraining future economic growth; instead, the capitalist mode of production was to be overturned before the productive forces of society could fully develop, bringing about an abundance of goods in a new society based on the principle of "from each according to ability, to each according to need" — that is, communism. The assumption, based on technological optimism, was that communism would overcome any resource scarcity ever to be encountered. For ideological reasons, then, orthodox Marxism has mostly been opposed to any concern with natural resource scarcity ever since Marx's own day.   However, the march of history has been hard on this ideology: By 1991, German sociologist Reiner Grundmann was able to make the rather sweeping observation that "Orthodox Marxism has vanished from the scene, leftism has turned green, and Marxists have become ecologists."
 In neoclassical economics, on the other hand, the preoccupation with society's long term growth and development inherent in classical economics was abandoned altogether; instead, economic analysis came to focus on the study of the relationship between given ends and given scarce means, forming the concept of general equilibrium theory within an essentially static framework. Hence, neoclassical economics achieved greater generality, but only by asking easier questions; and any concern with natural resource scarcity was neglected.  For this reason, modern ecological economists have deplored the simplified and ecologically harmful features of neoclassical economics: It has been argued that neoclassical economics has become a pseudoscience of choice between anything in general and nothing in particular, while neglecting the preferences of future generations; that the very terminology of neoclassical economics is so ecologically illiterate as to rarely even refer to natural resources or ecological limits; and that neoclassical economics has developed to become a dominant free market ideology legitimizing an ideal of society resembling a perpetual motion machine of economic growth at intolerable environmental and human costs.

Taken together, it has been argued that "... if Judeo-Christian monotheism took nature out of religion, Anglo-American economists (after about 1880) took nature out of economics." Almost one century later, Herman Daly has 
reintegrated nature into economics in his concept of a steady-state economy (see below).

John Maynard Keynes's concept of reaching saturation 

John Maynard Keynes was the paradigm founder of modern macroeconomics, and is widely considered today to be the most influential economist of the 20th century. Keynes rejected the basic tenet of classical economics that free markets would lead to full employment by themselves. Consequently, he recommended government intervention to stimulate aggregate demand in the economy, a macroeconomic policy now known as Keynesian economics. Keynes also believed that capital accumulation would reach saturation at some point in the future.

In his essay from 1930 on The Economic Possibilities of Our Grandchildren, Keynes ventured to look one hundred years ahead into the future and predict the standard of living in the 21st century. Writing at the beginning of the Great Depression, Keynes rejected the prevailing "bad attack of economic pessimism" of his own time and foresaw that by 2030, the grandchildren of his generation would live in a state of abundance, where saturation would have been reached. People would find themselves liberated from such economic activities as saving and capital accumulation, and be able to get rid of 'pseudo-moral principles' — avarice, exaction of interest, love of money — that had characterized capitalistic societies so far. Instead, people would devote themselves to the true art of life, to live "wisely and agreeably and well." Mankind would finally have solved "the economic problem," that is, the struggle for existence.

The similarity between John Stuart Mill's concept of the stationary state (see above) and Keynes's predictions in this essay has been noted. It has been argued that although Keynes was right about future growth rates, he underestimated the inequalities prevailing today, both within and across countries. He was also wrong in predicting that greater wealth would induce more leisure spent; in fact, the reverse trend seems to be true.

In his magnum opus on The General Theory of Employment, Interest and Money, Keynes looked only one generation ahead into the future and predicted that state intervention balancing aggregate demand would by then have caused capital accumulation to reach the point of saturation. The marginal efficiency of capital as well as the rate of interest would both be brought down to zero, and — if population was not increasing rapidly — society would finally "... attain the conditions of a quasi-stationary community where change and progress would result only from changes in technique, taste, population and institutions ..." Keynes believed this development would bring about the disappearance of the rentier class, something he welcomed: Keynes argued that rentiers incurred no sacrifice for their earnings, and their savings did not lead to productive investments unless aggregate demand in the economy was sufficiently high. "I see, therefore, the rentier aspect of capitalism as a transitional phase which will disappear when it has done its work."

Post-war economic expansion and emerging ecological concerns 
The economic expansion following World War II took place while mainstream economics largely neglected the importance of natural resources and environmental constraints in the development. Addressing this discrepancy, ecological concerns emerged in academia around 1970. Later on, these concerns developed into the formation of ecological economics as an academic subdiscipline in economics.

Post-war economic expansion and the neglect of mainstream economics 

After the ravages of World War II, the industrialised part of the world experienced almost three decades of unprecedented and prolonged economic expansion. This expansion — known today as the Post–World War II economic expansion — was brought about by international financial stability, low oil prices and ever increasing labour productivity in manufacturing. During the era, all the advanced countries who founded — or later joined — the OECD enjoyed robust and sustained growth rates as well as full employment. In the 1970s, the expansion ended with the 1973 oil crisis, resulting in the 1973–75 recession and the collapse of the Bretton Woods monetary system.

Throughout this era, mainstream economics — dominated by both neoclassical economics and Keynesian economics — developed theories and models where natural resources and environmental constraints were neglected.  Conservation issues related specifically to agriculture and forestry were left to specialists in the subdiscipline of environmental economics at the margins of the mainstream. As the theoretical framework of neoclassical economics — namely general equilibrium theory — was uncritically adopted and maintained by even environmental economics, this subdiscipline was rendered largely unable to consider important issues of concern to environmental policy.

In the years around 1970, the widening discrepancy between an ever-growing world economy on the one hand, and a mainstream economics discipline not taking into account the importance of natural resources and environmental constraints on the other hand, was finally addressed — indeed, challenged — in academia by a few unorthodox economists and researchers.

Emerging ecological concerns 
During the short period of time from 1966 to 1972, four works were published addressing the importance of natural resources and the environment to human society:

 In his 1966 philosophical-minded essay on The Economics of the Coming Spaceship Earth, economist and systems scientist Kenneth E. Boulding argued that mankind would soon have to adapt to economic principles much different than the past 'open earth' of illimitable plains and exploitative behaviour. On the basis of the thermodynamic principle of the conservation of matter and energy, Boulding developed the view that the flow of natural resources through the economy is a rough measure of the Gross national product (GNP); and, consequently, that society should start regarding the GNP as a cost to be minimized rather than a benefit to be maximized. Therefore, mankind would have to find its place in a cyclical ecological system without unlimited reservoirs of anything, either for extraction or for pollution — like a spaceman on board a spaceship. Boulding was not the first to make use of the 'Spaceship Earth' metaphor, but he was the one who combined this metaphor with the analysis of natural resource flows through the economy.
 In his 1971 magnum opus on The Entropy Law and the Economic Process, Romanian American economist Nicholas Georgescu-Roegen integrated the thermodynamic concept of entropy with economic analysis, and argued that all natural resources are irreversibly degraded when put to use in economic activity. What happens in the economy is that all matter and energy is transformed from states available for human purposes (valuable natural resources) to states unavailable for human purposes (valueless waste and pollution). In the history of economic thought, Georgescu-Roegen was also the first economist of some standing to theorise on the premise that all of earth's mineral resources will eventually be exhausted at some point (see below).  
 Also in 1971, pioneering ecologist and general systems analyst Howard T. Odum published his book on Environment, Power and Society, where he described human society in terms of ecology. He formulated the maximum power principle, according to which all organisms, ecosystems and human societies organise themselves in order to maximize their use of available energy for survival. Odum pointed out that those human societies with access to the higher quality of energy sources enjoyed an advantage over other societies in the Darwinian evolutionary struggle. Odum later co-developed the concept of emergy (i.e., embodied energy) and made other valuable contributions to ecology and systems analysis. His work provided the biological term 'ecology' with its broader societal meaning used today. 

 In 1972, scientist and systems analyst Dennis Meadows and his team of researchers had their study on The Limits to Growth published by the Club of Rome. The Meadows team modelled aggregate trends in the world economy and made the projection — not prediction — that by the mid to latter part of the 21st century, industrial production per capita, food supply per capita and world population would all reach a peak, and then rapidly decline in a vicious overshoot-and-collapse trajectory. Due to its dire pessimism, the study was scorned and dismissed by most mainstream economists at the time of its publication.   However, well into the 21st century, several independent researchers have confirmed that world economic trends so far do indeed match up to the original 'standard run' projections made by the Meadows team, indicating that a global collapse may still loom large in the not too distant future.   
Taken together, these four works were seminal in bringing about the formation of ecological economics later on.

Formation of ecological economics as an academic subdiscipline 

Although most of the theoretical and foundational work behind ecological economics was in place by the early 1970s, a long gestation period elapsed before this new academic subdiscipline in economics was properly named and institutionalized. Ecological economics was formally founded in 1988 as the culmination of a series of conferences and meetings through the 1980s, where key scholars interested in the ecology-economy interdependency were interacting with each other. The most important people involved in the establishment were Herman Daly and Robert Costanza from the US; AnnMari Jansson from Sweden; and Juan Martínez-Alier from Spain (Catalonia). Since 1989, the discipline has been organised in the International Society for Ecological Economics that publishes the journal of Ecological Economics.

When the ecological economics subdiscipline was established, Herman Daly's 'preanalytic vision' of the economy was widely shared among the members who joined in: The human economy is an open subsystem of a finite and non-growing ecosystem (earth's natural environment), and any subsystem of a fixed nongrowing system must itself at some point also become nongrowing. Indeed, it has been argued that the subdiscipline itself was born out of frustration with the unwillingness of the established disciplines to accept this vision. However, ecological economics has since been overwhelmed by the influence and domination of neoclassical economics and its everlasting free market orthodoxy. This development has been deplored by activistic ecological economists as an 'incoherent', 'shallow' and overly 'pragmatic' slide.

Herman Daly's concept of a steady-state economy 
Since the 1970s, Herman Daly has been the world's leading proponent of a steady-state economy. Throughout his career, Daly has published several books and articles on the subject.  He has also helped founding the Center for the Advancement of the Steady-State Economy (CASSE). He has received several prizes and awards in recognition of his work.

According to two independent comparative studies of American Daly's steady-state economics versus the later, competing school of degrowth from continental Europe, no differences of analytical substance exist between the two schools; only, Daly's bureaucratic — or even technocratic — top-down management of the economy fares badly with the more radical grassroots appeal of degrowth, as championed by French political scientist Serge Latouche (see below). 

The premise underlying Daly's concept of a steady-state economy is that the economy is an open subsystem of a finite and non-growing ecosystem (earth's natural environment). The economy is maintained by importing low-entropy matter-energy (resources) from nature; these resources are put through the economy, being transformed and manufactured into goods along the way; eventually, the throughput of matter-energy is exported to the environment as high-entropy waste and pollution. Recycling of material resources is possible, but only by using up some energy resources as well as an additional amount of other material resources; and energy resources, in turn, cannot be recycled at all, but are dissipated as waste heat. Out of necessity, then, any subsystem of a fixed nongrowing system must itself at some point also become nongrowing.

Daly argues that nature has provided basically two sources of wealth at man's disposal, namely a stock of terrestrial mineral resources and a flow of solar energy. An 'asymmetry' between these two sources of wealth exist in that we may — within some practical limits — extract the mineral stock at a rate of our own choosing (that is, rapidly), whereas the flow of solar energy is reaching earth at a rate beyond human control. Since the Sun will continue to shine on earth at a fixed rate for billions of years to come, it is the terrestrial mineral stock — and not the Sun — that constitutes the crucial scarcity factor regarding man's economic future.

Daly points out that today's global ecological problems are rooted in man's historical record: Until the Industrial Revolution that took place in Britain in the second half of the 18th century, man lived within the limits imposed by what Daly terms a 'solar-income budget': The Palaeolithic tribes of hunter-gatherers and the later agricultural societies of the Neolithic and onwards subsisted primarily — though not exclusively — on earth's biosphere, powered by an ample supply of renewable energy, received from the Sun. The Industrial Revolution changed this situation completely, as man began extracting the terrestrial mineral stock at a rapidly increasing rate. The original solar-income budget was thereby broken and supplemented by the new, but much scarcer source of wealth. Mankind still lives in the after-effect of this revolution.

Daly cautions that more than two hundred years of worldwide industrialisation is now confronting mankind with a range of problems pertaining to the future existence and survival of our species:

Following the work of Nicholas Georgescu-Roegen, Daly argues that the laws of thermodynamics restrict all human technologies and apply to all economic systems:

This view on the role of technology in the economy was later termed 'entropy pessimism' (see below).

In Daly's view, mainstream economists tend to regard natural resource scarcity as only a relative phenomenon, while human needs and wants are granted absolute status: It is believed that the price mechanism and technological development (however defined) is capable of overcoming any scarcity ever to be faced on earth; it is also believed that all human wants could and should be treated alike as absolutes, from the most basic necessities of life to the extravagant and insatiable craving for luxuries. Daly terms this belief 'growthmania', which he finds pervasive in modern society. In opposition to the dogma of growthmania, Daly submits that "... there is such a thing as absolute scarcity, and there is such a thing as purely relative and trivial wants". Once it is recognised that scarcity is imposed by nature in an absolute form by the laws of thermodynamics and the finitude of earth; and that some human wants are only relative and not worthy of satisfying; then we are all well on the way to the paradigm of a steady-state economy, Daly concludes.

Consequently, Daly recommends that a system of permanent government restrictions on the economy is established as soon as possible, a steady-state economy. Whereas the classical economists believed that the final stationary state would settle by itself as the rate of profit fell and capital accumulation came to an end (see above), Daly wants to create the steady-state politically by establishing three institutions of the state as a superstructure on top of the present market economy:

 The first institution is to correct inequality to some extent by putting minimum and maximum limits on incomes, maximum limits on wealth, and then redistribute accordingly.
 The second institution is to stabilise the population by issuing transferable reproduction licenses to all fertile women at a level corresponding with the general replacement fertility in society.
 The third institution is to stabilise the level of capital by issuing and selling depletion quotas that impose quantitative restrictions on the flow of resources through the economy. Quotas effectively minimise the throughput of resources necessary to maintain any given level of capital (as opposed to taxes, that merely alter the prevailing price structure).

The purpose of these three institutions is to stop and prevent further growth by combining what Daly calls "a nice reconciliation of efficiency and equity" and providing "the ecologically necessary macrocontrol of growth with the least sacrifice in terms of microlevel freedom and variability."

Among the generation of his teachers, Daly ranks Nicholas Georgescu-Roegen and Kenneth E. Boulding as the two economists he has learned the most from. However, both Georgescu-Roegen and Boulding have assessed that a steady-state economy may serve only as a temporary societal arrangement for mankind when facing the long-term issue of global mineral resource exhaustion: Even with a constant stock of people and capital, and a minimised (yet constant) flow of resources put through the world economy, earth's mineral stock will still be exhausted, although at a slower rate than is presently the situation (see below). 

Responding specifically to the criticism levelled at him by Georgescu-Roegen, Daly concedes that a steady-state economy will serve only to postpone, and not to prevent, the inevitable mineral resource exhaustion: "A steady-state economy cannot last forever, but neither can a growing economy, nor a declining economy". A frank and committed Protestant, Daly further argues that...

Later, several other economists in the field have agreed that not even a steady-state economy can last forever on earth.

Ecological reasons for a steady-state economy 
In 2021, a study checked if the current situation confirms the predictions of the book Limits to Growth. The conclusion was that in 10 years the global GDP will begin to decline. If it will not happen by deliberate transition it will happen by ecological disaster.

Planetary boundaries 

The world's mounting ecological problems have stimulated interest in the concept of a steady-state economy. Since the 1990s, most metrics have provided evidence that the volume of the world economy far exceeds critical global limits to economic growth already. According to the ecological footprint measure, earth's carrying capacity — that is, earth's long-term capacity to sustain human populations and consumption levels — was exceeded by some 30 percent in 1995. By 2018, this figure had increased to some 70 percent. In 2020 multinational team of scientists published a study, saying that overconsumption is the biggest threat to sustainability. According to the study a drastic change in lifestyle is necessary for solving the ecological crisis. According to one of the authors Julia Steinberger: “To protect ourselves from the worsening climate crisis, we must reduce inequality and challenge the notion that riches, and those who possess them, are inherently good.” The research was published on the site of the World Economic Forum. The leader of the forum professor Klaus Schwab, calls to a "great reset of capitalism".

In effect, mankind is confronted by an ecological crisis, in which humans are living outside of planetary boundaries which will have significant effects on human health and wellbeing. The significant impact of human activities on earth's ecosystems has motivated some geologists to propose the present epoch be named the anthropocene. The following issues have raised much concern worldwide:

Pollution and global warming
Air pollution emanating from motor vehicles and industrial plants is damaging public health and increasing mortality rates. The concentration of carbon dioxide and other greenhouse gases in the atmosphere is the apparent source of global warming and climate changes. Extreme regional weather patterns and rising sea levels caused by warming degrade living conditions in many — if not all — parts of the world. The warming already poses a security threat to many nations and works as a so-called 'threat multiplier' to geo-political stability. Even worse, the loss of Arctic permafrost may be triggering a massive release of methane and other greenhouse gases from thawing soils in the region, thereby overwhelming political action to counter climate change. If critical temperature thresholds are crossed, Earth's climate may transit from an 'icehouse' to a 'greenhouse' state for the first time in 34 million years.

One of the most common solutions to the climate crisis is transitioning to renewable energy, but it also has some environmental impacts. They are presented by the proponents of theories like degrowth steady-state economy and circular economy as one of the proofs that for achieving sustainability technological methods are not enough and there is a need to limit consumption

In 2019 a new report "Plastic and Climate" was published. According to the report, in 2019, plastic will contribute greenhouse gases in the equivalent of 850 million tons of carbon dioxide to the atmosphere. In current trend, annual emissions will grow to 1.34 billion tons by 2030. By 2050 plastic could emit 56 billion tons of greenhouse gas emissions, as much as 14 percent of the earth's remaining carbon budget, except the harm to Phytoplankton. The report says that only solutions which involve a reduction in consumption can solve the problem, while others like biodegradable plastic, ocean cleanup, using renewable energy in plastic industry can do little, and in some cases may even worsen it. Another report referring to all the environmental and health effects of plastic says the same.

Depletion of non-renewable minerals

Non-renewable mineral reserves are currently extracted at high and unsustainable rates from earth's crust. Remaining reserves are likely to become ever more costly to extract in the near future, and will reach depletion at some point. The era of relatively peaceful economic expansion that has prevailed globally since World War II may be interrupted by unexpected supply shocks or simply be succeeded by the peaking depletion paths of oil and other valuable minerals. In 2020 in the first time the rate of use of natural resources arrived to more than 110 billion tons per year

Economist Jason Hickel has written critically about the ideology of green-growth, the idea that as capitalism and systems expand, natural resources will also expand naturally, as it is compatible with our planet's ecology. This contradicts with the idea of no-growth economics, or degrowth economics, where the sustainability and stability of the economy is prioritized over the uncontrolled profit of those in power. Models around creating development in communities have found that failing to account for sustainability in early stages leads to failure in the long term. These models contradict green growth theory and do not support ideas about expansion of natural resources. Additionally,  those living in poorer areas tend to be exposed to higher levels of toxins and pollutants as a result of systematic environmental racism. Increasing natural resources and increasing local involvement in their distribution are potential solutions to alleviate pollution and address poverty in these areas.

Net depletion of renewable resources
Use of renewable resources in excess of their replenishment rates is undermining ecological stability worldwide. Between 2000 and 2012, deforestation resulted in some 14 percent of the equivalent of earth's original forest cover to be cut down. Tropical rainforests have been subject to deforestation at a rapid pace for decades — especially in west and central Africa and in Brazil — mostly due to subsistence farming, population pressure, and urbanization. Population pressures also strain the world's soil systems, leading to land degradation, mostly in developing countries. Global erosion rates on conventional cropland are estimated to exceed soil creation rates by more than ten times. Widespread overuse of groundwater results in water deficits in many countries. By 2025, water scarcity could impact the living conditions of two-thirds of the world's population.

Loss of biodiversity
The destructive impact of human activity on wildlife habitats worldwide is accelerating the extinction of rare species, thereby substantially reducing earth's biodiversity. The natural nitrogen cycle is heavily overloaded by industrial nitrogen fixation and use, thereby disrupting most known types of ecosystems. The accumulating plastic debris in the oceans decimates aquatic life. Ocean acidification due to the excess concentration of carbon dioxide in the atmosphere is resulting in coral bleaching and impedes shell-bearing organisms. Arctic sea ice decline caused by global warming is endangering the polar bear.

In 2019, a summary for policymakers of the largest, most comprehensive study to date of biodiversity and ecosystem services was published by the Intergovernmental Science-Policy Platform on Biodiversity and Ecosystem Services. The report was finalised in Paris. The main conclusions:

 Over the last 50 years, the state of nature has deteriorated at an unprecedented and accelerating rate.
 The main drivers of this deterioration have been changes in land and sea use, exploitation of living beings, climate change, pollution and invasive species. These five drivers, in turn, are caused by societal behaviors, from consumption to governance.
 Damage to ecosystems undermines 35 of 44 selected UN targets, including the UN General Assembly's  Sustainable Development Goals for poverty, hunger, health, water, cities' climate, oceans and land. It can cause problems with food, water and humanity's air supply.
 To fix the problem, humanity will need a transformative change, including sustainable agriculture, reductions in consumption and waste, fishing quotas and collaborative water management. On page 8 of the summary the authors state that one of the main measures is: " enabling visions of a good quality of life that do not entail ever-increasing material consumption;

These mounting concerns have prompted an increasing number of academics and other writers — beside Herman Daly — to point to limits to economic growth, and to question — and even oppose — the prevailing ideology of infinite economic growth.

In September 2019, 1 day before the Global Climate Strike on 20 September 2019 in the Guardian was published an article that summarizes many research and say that limiting consumption is necessary for saving the biosphere.

Steady-state economy and Well-being

Except the reasons linked to resource depletion and the carrying capacity of the ecological system, there are other reasons to limit consumption - overconsumption hurts the well-being of those who consume too much.

In the same time when the ecological footprint of humanity exceeded the sustainable level, while GDP more than tripled from 1950, one of the well-being measures genuine progress indicator has fallen from 1978. This is one of the reasons for pursuing the steady state economy.

In some cases reducing consumption can increase the life level.  In Costa Rica the GDP is 4 times smaller than in many countries in Western Europe and North America, but people live longer and better. An American study shows that when the income is higher than $75,000, an increase in profits does not increase well-being. For better measuring the well-being, the New Economics Foundation's has launched the Happy Planet Index.

The food industry is a large sector of consumption responsible for 37% of global greenhouse-gas emissions and studies show that people waste a fifth of food products just through disposal or overconsumption. By the time food reaches the consumer, 9% (160 million tons) goes uneaten and 10% is lost to overconsumption - meaning consumers ate more than the calorie intake requirement. When the consumer takes in too much, this not only explains losses at the beginning of the stage at production (and overproduction) but also lends itself to overconsumption of energy and protein, having harmful effects on the body like obesity.

A report from the Lancet commission says the same. The experts write: "Until now, undernutrition and obesity have been seen as polar opposites of either too few or too many calories," "In reality, they are both driven by the same unhealthy, inequitable food systems, underpinned by the same political economy that is single-focused on economic growth, and ignores the negative health and equity outcomes. Climate change has the same story of profits and power,". Obesity was a medical problem for people who overconsumed food and worked too little already in ancient Rome, and its impact slowly grew through history. As to 2012, mortality from Obesity was 3 times larger than from hunger, reaching 2.8 million people per year by 2017

Cycling reduces greenhouse gas emissions while reducing the effects of a sedentary lifestyle at the same time. As of 2002 sedentary lifestyle claimed 2 million lives per year. The World Health Organization stated that: "60 to 85% of people in the world—from both developed and developing countries—lead sedentary lifestyles, making it one of the more serious yet insufficiently addressed public health problems of our time. ". By 2012 according to a study published in 'The Lancet" the number reached 5.3 million

Reducing the use of screens can help fight many diseases, among others depression, the leading cause of disability globally. It also can lower greenhouse gas emission. As of 2018, 3.7% of global emissions were from digital technologies more than from aviation, the number is expected to achieve 8% by 2025, equal to the emissions from cars.

Reducing Light pollution can reduce GHG emissions and improve health

In September 2019, 1 day before the Global Climate Strike on 20 September 2019, an article was published in "The Guardian" that summarizes much research and says that limiting consumption is necessary for the health of big consumers: it can increase empathy improve the contacts with other people, and more.

Connection with other ideologies, movements 
The concept of steady state economy is connected to other concepts that can be generally defined as Ecological economics and Anti-consumerism, because it serve as the final target of those concepts: Those ideologies are not calling for poverty but wants to reach a level of consumption that is the best for people and the environment.

Degrowth 
The Center for the Advancement of the Steady State Economy (CASSE) define steady state economy, not only as an economy with some constant level of consumption, but as an economy with the best possible level of consumption maintained constantly. To define what is this level, it consider not only ecology, but also life level. It writes: "In cases where the benefits of growth outweigh the costs (for example, where people are not consuming enough to meet their needs), growth or redistribution of resources may be required. In cases where the size of the economy has surpassed the carrying capacity of the ecosystems that contain it (a condition known as overshoot), degrowth may be required before establishing a steady state economy that can be maintained over the long term".

In February 2020, the same organization proposed a slogan of "Degrowth Toward a Steady State Economy" because it can unify degrowthers and steady staters. In the statement is mentioned, that: "In 2018 the nascent DegrowUS adopted the mission statement, "Our mission is a democratic and just transition to a smaller, steady state economy in harmony with nature, family, and community.".

In his article on Economic de-growth vs. steady-state economy, Christian Kerschner has integrated the strategy of declining-state, or degrowth, with Herman Daly's concept of the steady-state economy to the effect that degrowth should be considered a path taken by the rich industrialized countries leading towards a globally equitable steady-state economy. This ultra-egalitarian path will then make ecological room for poorer countries to catch up and combine into a final world steady-state, maintained at some internationally agreed upon intermediate and 'optimum' level of activity for some period of time — although not forever. Kerschner admits that this goal of a world steady-state may remain unattainable in the foreseeable future, but such seemingly unattainable goals could stimulate visions about how to better approach them.

The concept of Overdevelopment by Leopold Cohr 

In 1977 Leopold Kohr published a book named The Overdeveloped Nations: The Diseconomies Of Scale, talking primarily about overconsumption. This book is the basis for the theory of overdevelopment, saying that the global north, the rich countries are too developed, which increases the Ecological footprint of humanity and create many problems both in overdeveloped and underdeveloped countries.

Conceptual and ideological disagreements 

Several conceptual and ideological disagreements presently exist concerning the steady-state economy in particular and the dilemma of growth in general. The following issues are considered below: The role of technology; resource decoupling and the rebound effect; a declining-state economy; the possibility of having capitalism without growth; and the possibility of pushing some of the terrestrial limits into outer space.

In 2019 a research, presenting an overview of the attempts to achieve constant economic growth without environmental destruction and their results, was published. It shows that by the year 2019 the attempts were not successful. It does not give a clear answer about future attempts.

Herman Daly's approach to these issues are presented throughout the text.

Role of technology 

Technology is usually defined as the application of scientific method in the production of goods or in other social achievements. Historically, technology has mostly been developed and implemented in order to improve labour productivity and increase living standards. In economics, disagreement presently exists regarding 
the role of technology when considering its dependency on natural resources:

 In neoclassical economics, on the one hand, the role of 'technology' is usually represented as yet another factor of production contributing to economic growth, like land, labour and capital contribute. However, in neoclassical production functions, where the output of produced goods are related to the inputs provided by the factors of production, no mention is made of the contribution of natural resources to the production process. Hence, 'technology' is reified as a separate, self-contained device, capable of contributing to production without receiving any natural resource inputs beforehand. This representation of 'technology' also prevails in standard mainstream economics textbooks on the subject.  

 In ecological economics, on the other hand, 'technology' is represented as the way natural resources are transformed in the production process. Hence, Herman Daly argues that the role of technology in the economy cannot be properly conceptualized without taking into account the flow of natural resources necessary to support the technology itself: An internal combustion engine runs on fuels; machinery and electric devices run on electricity; all capital equipment is made out of material resources to begin with. In physical terms, any technology — useful though it is — works largely as a medium for transforming valuable natural resources into material goods that eventually end up as valueless waste and pollution, thereby increasing the entropy — or disorder — of the world as a whole. This view of the role of technology in the economy has been termed 'entropy pessimism'.

From the ecological point of view, it has been suggested that the disagreement boils down to a matter of teaching some elementary physics to the uninitiated neoclassical economists and other technological optimists.    From the neoclassical point of view, leading growth theorist and Nobel Prize laureate Robert Solow has defended his much criticised position by replying in 1997 that 'elementary physics' has not by itself prevented growth in the industrialized countries so far.

Resource decoupling and the rebound effect 

Resource decoupling occurs when economic activity becomes less intensive ecologically: A declining input of natural resources is needed to produce one unit of output on average, measured by the ratio of total natural resource consumption to gross domestic product (GDP). Relative resource decoupling occurs when natural resource consumption declines on a ceteris paribus assumption — that is, all other things being equal. Absolute resource decoupling occurs when natural resource consumption declines, even while GDP is growing.

In the history of economic thought, William Stanley Jevons was the first economist of some standing to analyse the occurrence of resource decoupling, although he did not use this term. In his 1865 book on The Coal Question, Jevons argued that an increase in energy efficiency would by itself lead to more, not less, consumption of energy: Due to the income effect of the lowered energy expenditures, people would be rendered better off and demand even more energy, thereby outweighing the initial gain in efficiency. This mechanism is known today as the Jevons paradox or the rebound effect. Jevons's analysis of this seeming paradox formed part of his general concern that Britain's industrial supremacy in the 19th century would soon be set back by the inevitable exhaustion of the country's coal mines, whereupon the geopolitical balance of power would tip in favour of countries abroad possessing more abundant mines.  

In 2009, two separate studies were published that — among other things — addressed the issues of resource decoupling and the rebound effect: German scientist and politician Ernst Ulrich von Weizsäcker published Factor Five: Transforming the Global Economy through 80% Improvements in Resource Productivity, co-authored with a team of researchers from The Natural Edge Project. British ecological economist Tim Jackson published Prosperity Without Growth, drawing extensively from an earlier report authored by him for the UK Sustainable Development Commission. Consider each in turn:
 Ernst Ulrich von Weizsäcker argues that a new economic wave of innovation and investment — based on increasing resource productivity, renewable energy, industrial ecology and other green technology — will soon kick off a 'Green Kondratiev' cycle, named after the Russian economist Nikolai Kondratiev. This new long-term cycle is expected to bring about as much as an 80 percent increase in resource productivity, or what amounts to a 'Factor Five' improvement of the gross input per output ratio in the economy, and reduce environmental impact accordingly, von Weizsäcker promises. Regarding the adverse rebound effect, von Weizsäcker notes that "... efforts to improve efficiency have been fraught with increasing overall levels of consumption." As remedies, von Weizsäcker recommends three separate approaches: Recycling of and imposing restrictions on the use of materials; establishing capital funds from natural resource proceeds for reinvestments in order to compensate for the future bust caused by depletion; and finally, taxing resource consumption so as to balance it with the available supplies.
 Tim Jackson points out that according to empirical evidence, the world economy has indeed experienced some relative resource decoupling: In the period from 1970 to 2009, the 'energy intensity' — that is, the energy content embodied in world GDP—decreased by 33 percent; but as the world economy also kept growing, carbon dioxide emissions from fossil fuels have increased by 80 percent during the same period of time. Hence, no absolute energy resource decoupling materialized. Regarding key metal resources, the development was even worse in that not even relative resource decoupling have materialized in the period from 1990 to 2007: The extraction of iron ore, bauxite, copper and nickel was rising faster than world GDP to the effect that "resource efficiency is going in the wrong direction," mostly due to emerging economies — notably China — building up their infrastructure. Jackson concludes his survey by noting that the 'dilemma of growth' is evident when any resource efficiency squeezed out of the economy will sooner or later be pushed back up again by a growing GDP. Jackson further cautions that "simplistic assumptions that capitalism's propensity for efficiency will stabilize the climate and solve the problem of resource scarcity are almost literally bankrupt."

Herman Daly has argued that the best way to increase natural resource efficiency (decouple) and to prevent the occurrence of any rebound effects is to impose quantitative restrictions on resource use by establishing a cap and trade system of quotas, managed by a government agency. Daly believes this system features a unique triple advantage:

 Absolute and permanent limits are set on the extraction rate of, use of and pollution with the resources flowing through the economy; as opposed to taxes that merely alter the prevailing price structure without stopping growth; and as opposed to pollution standards and control which are both costly and difficult to enact and enforce.
 More efficiency and recycling efforts are induced by the higher resource prices resulting from the restrictions (quota prices plus regular extraction costs).
 No rebound effects are able to appear, as any temporary excess demand will result only in inflation or shortages, or both — and not in increased supply, which is to remain constant and limited on a permanent basis.

For all its merits, Daly himself points to the existence of physical, technological and practical limitations to how much efficiency and recycling can be achieved by this proposed system. The idea of absolute decoupling ridding the economy as a whole of any dependence on natural resources is ridiculed polemically by Daly as 'angelizing GDP': It would work only if we ascended to become angels ourselves.

Declining-state economy 

A declining-state economy is an economy made up of a declining stock of physical wealth (capital) or a declining population size, or both. A declining-state economy is not to be confused with a recession: Whereas a declining-state economy is established as the result of deliberate political action, a recession is the unexpected and unwelcome failure of a growing or a steady economy.

Proponents of a declining-state economy generally believe that a steady-state economy is not far-reaching enough for the future of mankind. Some proponents may even reject modern civilization as such, either partly or completely, whereby the concept of a declining-state economy begins bordering on the ideology of anarcho-primitivism, on radical ecological doomsaying or on some variants of survivalism.

Romanian American economist Nicholas Georgescu-Roegen was the teacher and mentor of Herman Daly and is presently considered the main intellectual figure influencing the degrowth movement that formed in France and Italy in the early 2000s. In his 
paradigmatic magnum opus on The Entropy Law and the Economic Process, Georgescu-Roegen argues that the carrying capacity of earth — that is, earth's capacity to sustain human populations and consumption levels — is bound to decrease sometime in the future as earth's finite stock of mineral resources is presently being extracted and put to use; and consequently, that the world economy as a whole is heading towards an inevitable future collapse. In effect, Georgescu-Roegen points out that the arguments advanced by Herman Daly in support of his steady-state economy apply with even greater force in support of a declining-state economy: When the overall purpose is to ration and stretch mineral resource use for as long time into the future as possible, zero economic growth is more desirable than growth is, true; but negative growth is better still! Instead of Daly's steady-state economics, Georgescu-Roegen proposed his own so-called 'minimal bioeconomic program', featuring restrictions even more severe than those propounded by his former student Daly (see above).  

American political advisor Jeremy Rifkin, French champion of the degrowth movement Serge Latouche and Austrian degrowth theorist Christian Kerschner — who all take their cue from Georgescu-Roegen's work — have argued in favour of declining-state strategies. Consider each in turn:

 In his book on Entropy: A New World View, Jeremy Rifkin argues that the impending exhaustion of earth's mineral resources will mark the decline of the industrial age, followed by the advent of a new solar age, based on renewable solar power. Due to the diffuse, low-intensity property of solar radiation, this source of energy is incapable of sustaining industrialism, whether capitalist or socialist. Consequently, Rifkin advocates an anarcho-primitivist future solar economy — or what he terms an 'entropic society' — based on anti-consumerism, deindustrialization, counterurbanization, organic farming and prudential restraints on childbirths. Rifkin cautions that the transition to the solar age is likely to become a troublesome phase in the history of mankind, as the present world economy is so dependent on the non-renewable mineral resources.
 In his manifesto on Farewell to Growth, Serge Latouche develops a strategy of so-called 'ecomunicipalism' to initiate a 'virtuous cycle of quiet contraction' or degrowth of economic activity at the local level of society: Consumption patterns and addiction to work should be reduced; systems of fair taxation and consumption permits should redistribute the gains from economic activity within and among countries; obsolescence and waste should be reduced, products designed so as to make recycling easier. This bottom-up strategy opposes overconsumption in rich countries as well as emerging, poor countries to aspire this overconsumption of the rich. Instead, the purpose of degrowth is to establish the convivial and sustainable society where people can live better lives whilst working and consuming less. Latouche further cautions that "the very survival of humanity ... means that ecological concerns must be a central part of our social, political, cultural and spiritual preoccupation with human life." 

Herman Daly on his part is not opposed to the concept of a declining-state economy; but he does point out that the steady-state economy should serve as a preliminary first step on a declining path, once the optimal levels of population and capital have been properly defined. However, this first step is an important one:

Daly concedes that it is 'difficult, probably impossible' to define such optimum levels; even more, in his final analysis Daly agrees with his teacher and mentor Georgescu-Roegen that no defined optimum will be able to last forever (see above).

Capitalism without growth 

Several radical critics of capitalism have questioned the possibility of ever imposing a steady-state or a declining-state (degrowth) system as a superstructure on top of capitalism.   Taken together, these critics point to the following growth dynamics inherent in capitalism:
 Economic activity is generally guided by the profit motive, a competitive work ethos and the drive to accumulate capital and wealth for its own sake to gratify personal ambition, provide social prestige — or simply to get rich in a hurry. Psychologically, these drives in the work sphere repress and distort biological and social homeostasis in most people.
 Employments and incomes depend directly on sales revenues, that is, on people spending money on the consumption of goods and services for sale on the market. This dependency creates a pecuniary incentive to increase sales as much as possible. To this end, much cunning advertising is devised to manipulate human wants and prop up consumption patterns, often resulting in lavish and wasteful consumerism.
 The financial system is based on fractional-reserve banking, enabling commercial banks to hold reserves in amounts that are less than their deposit liabilities. This credit creation is multiplying the monetary base supplied by the central bank in order to assist private corporations expanding their activities.
 Technological development exhibits a strong labour-saving bias, creating the need to provide new employment elsewhere in the economy for workers displaced by the introduction of new technology.
 Private corporations generally resist government regulations and restrictions that impede profits and deter investment opportunities. Attempts to downscale the economy would rapidly degenerate into economic crisis and political instability on this count alone.
 Governments need tax revenues to service their debt obligations, run their institutions and finance their welfare programmes for the benefit of the public. Tax revenues are collected from general economic activity.
 In the capitalist world economy, globalisation intensifies competition everywhere, both within and between countries. National governments are compelled to compete and struggle with each other to provide employment, investments, tax revenues and wealth for their own populations.
— In short: There is no end to the systemic and ecologically harmful growth dynamics in modern capitalism, radical critics assert.

Fully aware of the massive growth dynamics of capitalism, Herman Daly on his part poses the rhetorical question whether his concept of a steady-state economy is essentially capitalistic or socialistic. He provides the following answer (written in 1980):

Daly concludes by inviting all (most) people — both liberal supporters of and radical critics of capitalism — to join him in his effort to develop a steady-state economy.

Pushing some of the terrestrial limits into outer space 

Ever since the beginning of the modern Space Age in the 1950s, some space advocates have pushed for space habitation, frequently in the form of colonization, some arguing as a reason for alleviating human overpopulation, overconsumption and mitigate the human impact on the environment on Earth (if not for other reasons).

In the 1970s, physicist and space activist Gerard K. O'Neill developed a large plan to build human settlements in outer space to solve the problems of overpopulation and limits to growth on earth without recourse to political repression. According to O'Neill's vision, mankind could — and indeed should — expand on this man-made frontier to many times the current world population and generate large amounts of new wealth in space. Herman Daly countered O'Neill's vision by arguing that a space colony would become subject to much harsher limits to growth — and hence, would have to be secured and managed with much more care and discipline — than a steady-state economy on large and resilient earth. Although the number of individual colonies supposedly could be increased without end, living conditions in any one particular colony would become very restricted nonetheless. Therefore, Daly concluded: "The alleged impossibility of a steady-state on earth provides a poor intellectual launching pad for space colonies."

By the 2010s, O'Neill's old vision of space colonisation had long since been turned upside down in many places: Instead of dispatching colonists from earth to live in remote space settlements, some ecology-minded space advocates conjecture that resources could be mined from asteroids in space and transported back to earth for use here. This new vision has the same double advantage of (partly) mitigating ecological pressures on earth's limited mineral reserves while also boosting exploration and colonisation of space. The building up of industrial infrastructure in space would be required for the purpose, as well as the establishment of a complete supply chain up to the level of self-sufficiency and then beyond, eventually developing into a permanent extraterrestrial source of wealth to provide an adequate return on investment for stakeholders. In the future, such an 'exo-economy' (off-planet economy) could possibly even serve as the first step towards mankind's cosmic ascension to a 'Type II' civilisation on the hypothetical Kardashev scale, in case such an ascension will ever be accomplished.

However, it is yet uncertain whether an off-planet economy of the type specified will develop in due time to match both the volume and the output mix needed to fully replace earth's dwindling mineral reserves. Sceptics like Herman Daly and others point to exorbitant earth-to-orbit launch costs of any space mission, inaccurate identification of target asteroids suitable for mining, and remote in situ ore extraction difficulties as obvious barriers to success: Investing a lot of terrestrial resources in order to recover only a few resources from space in return is not worthwhile in any case, regardless of the scarcities, technologies and other mission parameters involved in the venture. In addition, even if an off-planet economy could somehow be established at some future point, one long-term predicament would then loom large regarding the continuous mining and transportation of massive volumes of materials from space back to earth: How to keep up that volume flowing on a steady and permanent basis in the face of the astronomically long distances and time scales ever present in space. In the worst of cases, all of these obstacles could forever prevent any substantial pushing of limits into outer space — and then limits to growth on earth will remain the only limits of concern throughout mankind's entire span of existence.

Implementation 
Today, steady state economy is not implemented officially by any state, but there are some measures that limit growth and means a steady level of consumption of some products per capita:

 Phase-out of lightweight plastic bags that reduce consumption of bags and limit the number of bags per capita.
 Reducing the consumption of energy is a very popular measure implemented by many, called generally Energy Efficiency and Energy Saving. A coalition named "3% Club for Energy Efficiency" was formed with a target of increasing energy efficiency by 3% per year. According to the International Energy Agency, Energy Efficiency can deliver more than 40% of the reduction in Greenhouse-gas emissions needed to reach the target of Paris Agreement.
 In the 2019 UN Climate Action Summit, a coalition was created named "Action Towards Climate Friendly Transport"; its main targets include city planning that will reduce the need for transport and shifting to a non-motorized transport system Such measures reduce the consumption of fuel.
 A method with growing popularity is Reduce, reuse and recycle. For example, reuse clothes, through the second hand market and renting clothes. The second hand market worth 24 billion$ as of 2018 and is expected to achieve bigger profit than the fast fashion market in the next years. The H&M company tries to implement it.

Some countries accepted measurements, alternatives to Gross domestic product to measure success:

 Bhutan measure success in Gross National Happiness. This measurement was implemented partly in other countries.
 Other popular measurements include Gross National Well-being, Better Life Index and Social Progress Index (see pages). As of 2014, the Happy Planet Index is used in 153 countries, the OECD Better Life Index in 36 countries, members of OECD.
 Ecuador and Bolivia included in their constitutions the ideology of Sumac Kawsay (Buen Vivir) that "incorporates ideas of de-growth", e.g. contain some principles of the steady state economy.

See also 

History of economic thought
Circular economy
Classical economics
Creative destruction
Criticism of capitalism
Degrowth
Ecological economics
Economic equilibrium
Post-growth
The Limits to Growth
Prosperity Without Growth
Market failure: Ecological market failure
Environmentalism
Ecological footprint
Planetary boundaries
Planned economy
Sustainability: Carrying capacity
Human overpopulation
Jevons paradox
Peak minerals
Kenneth E. Boulding
Herman Daly
Nicholas Georgescu-Roegen: Criticising Daly's steady-state economics
Sea level rise

References

External links

Websites

CASSE, Center for the Advancement of the Steady State Economy.
ISEE, The International Society for Ecological Economics.
Global Footprint Network. Advancing the Science of Sustainability.
Steady State Revolution. Fighting for a Sustainable World with a Steady State Economy.
Post Growth Institute. Creating global prosperity without economic growth.

Articles

Interviews and other material related to Herman Daly

 (Lengthy interview spanning fifteen web pages)

 (Excerpt from his Steady-state economics)
 (Essay summarizing his views)

Economics of sustainability
Economic growth
Demographic economic problems
Human overpopulation
Human impact on the environment
Global environmental issues
Ecological economics
Environmental social science
Green politics
Waste minimisation
Energy conservation
Natural resource management
Schools of economic thought
Economic systems
Degrowth
Future problems